Czesław Krakowski (7 June 1950 – 21 January 2022) was a Polish politician. A member of the Polish People's Party, he served in the Senate of Poland from 1993 to 1997. He died in Płock on 21 January 2022, at the age of 71.

References

1950 births
2022 deaths
Members of the Senate of Poland 1993–1997
Polish People's Party politicians
United People's Party (Poland) politicians
Self-Defence of the Republic of Poland politicians
University of Warmia and Mazury in Olsztyn alumni
Politicians from Płock